Boniface of Montferrat may refer to:

Boniface I, Marquis of Montferrat (r. 1192–1207), also king of Thessalonica from 1204
Boniface II, Marquis of Montferrat (r. 1225–1253), also titular king of Thessalonica from 1239
Boniface III, Marquis of Montferrat (r. 1483–1494)
Boniface IV, Marquis of Montferrat (r. 1518–1530)